El Puente is a municipality in Bolivia. In 2009 it had an estimated population of 3032.

References

Municipalities of Santa Cruz Department (Bolivia)